The 1980 Cincinnati Reds season was a season in American baseball. The Reds finished in third place in the National League West with a record of 89-73, 3½ games behind the Houston Astros, marking the first time since 1971 that the Reds did not finish in either first or second place. The Reds were managed by John McNamara and played their home games at Riverfront Stadium.

Offseason 
 December 3, 1979: Doug Corbett was drafted from the Reds by the Minnesota Twins in the 1979 rule 5 draft.

Regular season 
On July 4, pitcher Nolan Ryan of the Houston Astros recorded the 3000th strikeout of his career by striking out Reds player César Gerónimo.

Season standings

Record vs. opponents

Notable transactions 
 June 3, 1980: 1980 Major League Baseball Draft
Ron Robinson was drafted by the Reds in the 1st round (19th pick).
Danny Tartabull was drafted by the Reds in the 3rd round. Player signed June 10, 1980.
Eric Davis was drafted by the Reds in the 8th round. Player signed June 8, 1980.
 June 13, 1980: Joe Nolan was signed as a free agent by the Reds.

Roster

Player stats

Batting

Starters by position 
Note: Pos = Position; G = Games played; AB = At bats; H = Hits; Avg. = Batting average; HR = Home runs; RBI = Runs batted in

Other batters 
Note: G = Games played; AB = At bats; H = Hits; Avg. = Batting average; HR = Home runs; RBI = Runs batted in

Pitching

Starting pitchers 
Note: G = Games pitched; IP = Innings pitched; W = Wins; L = Losses; ERA = Earned run average; SO = Strikeouts

Other pitchers 
Note: G = Games pitched; IP = Innings pitched; W = Wins; L = Losses; ERA = Earned run average; SO = Strikeouts

Relief pitchers 
Note: G = Games pitched; W = Wins; L = Losses; SV = Saves; ERA = Earned run average; SO = Strikeouts

Farm system 

LEAGUE CO-CHAMPIONS: Eugene

Notes

References 
1980 Cincinnati Reds season at Baseball Reference

Cincinnati Reds seasons
Cincinnati Reds season
Cinc